The Departmental Council of Mayenne is the deliberative assembly of the Mayenne department in the region of Pays de la Loire. It consists of 34 members (general councilors) from 17 cantons.

The President of the General Council is Olivier Richefou.

Vice-Presidents 
The President of the Departmental Council is assisted by 10 vice-presidents chosen from among the departmental advisers. Each of them has a delegation of authority.

References

See also 
 Mayenne
 General councils of France
 Departmental Council of Mayenne (official website)

Mayenne
Mayenne